Lawless Creek is a creek in the Similkameen region of British Columbia. Lawless Creek was originally called Bear Creek. The creek was discovered in 1885 and mined for gold. Platinum was also found there

References

Rivers of British Columbia